The 1958 Portuguese Grand Prix was a Formula One motor race held at Circuito da Boavista, Oporto on 24 August 1958. It was race 9 of 11 in the 1958 World Championship of Drivers and race 8 of 10 in the 1958 International Cup for Formula One Manufacturers.

Mike Hawthorn was initially disqualified for restarting his car against the direction of the circuit, losing seven points. However, Championship rival Stirling Moss had seen the incident which caused the disqualification and went to the judges to revert the decision since he felt Hawthorn had done nothing wrong. Eventually, Hawthorn was classified and retained his seven points.

Classification

Qualifying

Race

Notes
 – Includes 1 point for fastest lap

Championship standings after the race

Drivers' Championship standings

Constructors' Championship standings

 Notes: Only the top five positions are included for both sets of standings. Only the best 6 results counted towards each Championship. Numbers without parentheses are Championship points; numbers in parentheses are total points scored.

References

Portuguese Grand Prix
Portuguese Grand Prix
Portuguese Grand Prix
Sports competitions in Porto